Aftab Hasan (Urdu: آفتاب حسن) commonly known as Major Aftab (ميجر آفتاب), was an educationist, linguist, and instrumental in introducing science education in the Pakistani public school system.

See also 
 National Language Authority

References 

Pakistani scholars
Pakistani writers
Urdu-language writers
Linguists of Urdu
Urdu critics
Muhajir people
Aligarh Muslim University alumni